Mykhaylychenko is a Ukrainian surname formed out of personal name Michael (Mykhailo).  Its Russian-language transliteration is Mikhailichenko or Mikhaylichenko.

The surname may refer to:

 Larisa Mikhalchenko (born 1963), retired Ukrainian discus thrower
 Oleksiy Mykhaylychenko (born 1963), Ukrainian football coach and former player
 Ivan Mikhailichenko (1920–1982), Soviet Ukrainian World War II pilot, twice Hero of the Soviet Union
 Yevgeniy Mikhailichenko, Russian athlete

See also
 Mykhaylenko
 Mikhaylov (disambiguation)
 Mikhaylovsk
 Mikhaylovsky (disambiguation)
 Mikhaylovka (disambiguation)

Ukrainian-language surnames